The Confessor is the seventh solo studio album by American rock musician Joe Walsh, released on May 21, 1985 by Warner Bros. Records, and Full Moon Records. It was produced by Grammy Award-winning producer and sound engineer Keith Olsen as well as Walsh himself. The album peaked at number 65 on the Billboard 200.

Album artwork
The cover art for the album features the painting Zwei Männer in Betrachtung des Mondes (Two Men Contemplating the Moon), a famous work by the German nineteenth-century romantic landscape artist Caspar David Friedrich, with a grainy photograph of Walsh in behind. The back cover is another painting by Friedrich, Der Wanderer über dem Nebelmeer (Wanderer above the Sea of Fog).

Composition
The album includes a cover of Michael Stanley's "Rosewood Bitters," which got some FM airplay in the US; Walsh played slide guitar on the original recording which Stanley originally recorded. On this version instead he plays an electric guitar.
  
"Slow Dancing" is a song written by Loz Netto for Walsh. Netto was the guitarist in the English band Moon from the mid 1970s and the band Sniff 'n' the Tears from the late 1970s.

A variety of styles are explored on this album, including elements of blues, pop, and even Caribbean music. The title song is more in the vein of progressive rock.

Recording
Walsh's new girlfriend Stevie Nicks would get involved with the recording of this album, as her old friend Keith Olsen was hired to produce the album. The superimposed LA session stalwarts like Jim Keltner, Mike Porcaro, Waddy Wachtel, Randy Newman, Alan Pasqua and a lot of musicians Walsh had never worked with before were the musicians who played on the album. However, the only familiar face was Timothy B. Schmit (of the Eagles) who only recorded backing vocals.

Critical reception

Upon its release, the album was poorly received by many critics but sold quite well. Guitar World critic Bruce Malamut wrote that the album is "the apologia of a strictly raised mid-western episcopalian after living in rock and roll sin for ‘Fifteen Years’ on the road," and that "The balance … is a sober retrospective from rock’s own Harpo Marx." Rolling Stone said that "Walsh is trying to make the kind of record he used to make a decade ago, and the result is, well, out of date, sound [sic] like something out of a 1975 time capsule." Writing retrospectively for AllMusic, critic James Chrispell highly complimented the title track, but wrote of the album "Joe Walsh just hasn't been able to produce a complete album of great material, and The Confessor is no exception. The first half is dreck... Worthwhile for the title track alone."

Live performances and Tour
After the release of the album, Walsh toured again with Joe Vitale in Australia and in the US. In Australia the band was called Creatures from America. In the US they were the opening act on some gigs for Foreigner.

"The Confessor" and "Good Man Down" were the only tracks from this album which were performed live on that tour.

Track listing

Personnel
Musicians
 Joe Walsh – lead vocals, synthesizers, lead guitars, bass, talk box
 Randy Newman – keyboards
 Alan Pasqua – keyboards
 Waddy Wachtel – guitars
 Mark Andes – bass
 Dennis Belfield – bass
 Mike Porcaro – bass
 David Margen – bass
 Keith Olsen – bass
 Rick Rosas – bass
 Denny Carmassi – drums
 Jim Keltner – drums
 Rick Marotta – drums
 Chet McCracken – drums
 Jeff Porcaro – drums
 Jerry Peterson – saxophones
 Earl Lon Price – tenor saxophone
 Kenneth Tussing – trombone
 Timothy B. Schmit – backing vocals

Production
 Joe Walsh – producer
 Keith Olsen – producer 
 Although unaccredited, Walsh (in a June 2012 interview on Howard Stern) stated that Stevie Nicks "rode shotgun" with him during the production of this album.

Engineering
 Keith Olsen – engineer 
 Dennis Sager – engineer
 Goodnight LA Studios (Van Nuys, California) – recording and mixing location 
 Greg Fulginiti – mastering at Artisan Sound Recorders (Hollywood, California)

Album artwork
 Hugh Kent Brown – art direction, design 
 Caspar David Friedrich – paintings
 The titles of the paintings by Friedrich:
 Front cover: "Zwei Männer in Betrachtung des Mondes" (English: Two Men Contemplating the Moon)
 Back cover: "Der Wanderer über dem Nebelmeer" (English: Wanderer above the Sea of Fog)

Charts
Album – Billboard (United States)

Singles – Billboard (United States)

See also
 1985 in music
 Joe Walsh discography

References

External links
 

1985 albums
Joe Walsh albums
Albums produced by Keith Olsen
Albums produced by Joe Walsh
Warner Records albums
Atlantic Records albums
Pop rock albums by American artists